Daniel Sprong (born March 17, 1997) is a Dutch professional ice hockey forward currently under contract with the Seattle Kraken of the National Hockey League (NHL). Sprong was originally selected by the Pittsburgh Penguins in the second round (46th overall) of the 2015 NHL Entry Draft after playing two seasons with the Charlottetown Islanders of the Quebec Major Junior Hockey League (QMJHL), and made the Penguins immediately after being drafted, though he would return to the QMJHL and play two more seasons with the Islanders. He played parts of four seasons with Pittsburgh and their American Hockey League affiliate before being traded to the Anaheim Ducks in 2018, where he spent two seasons before being traded to the Washington Capitals in 2020. He was traded to Seattle in 2022.

Born in the Netherlands, Sprong moved to Canada with his family in 2005 in order to further his hockey career. Though a Dutch citizen, Sprong has declined to play internationally for the Dutch national team in hopes of playing for the Canadian national team instead.

Playing career

Junior
Sprong first played hockey as a young child in his hometown of Amsterdam. Due to the lack of a developed hockey program in the Netherlands, at ages four and five, Sprong played on teams with players as old as twelve or thirteen. To help further Sprong's development in hockey, his family moved to L'Île-Bizard, Quebec, in 2005 when he was eight years old.

In Quebec, Sprong played in several local minor ice hockey leagues while a member of the Deux-Rives program, including the 2008 and 2009 Quebec International Pee-Wee Hockey Tournaments with them. For the 2011–12 season, however, Sprong joined the Wilkes-Barre/Scranton Knights, a Pennsylvania-based travelling team. Back in Quebec the following season, with the Lac St-Louis Tigres, Sprong set the Quebec Midget Espoir AA league (the second-tier league in Quebec; as a non-citizen Sprong was ineligible to play in the top tier) scoring record with 104 points in 30 games. He was then selected thirteenth overall by the Charlottetown Islanders in the 2013 QMJHL Entry Draft, and joined the team for the 2013–14 QMJHL season. He led the Islanders in scoring with 68 points in 67 games and his outstanding play was recognized when he was named to the 2013–14 QMJHL All-Rookie Team. The following season, Sprong again led the Islanders in scoring, and was twelfth overall in the QMJHL, with 88 points. He was also invited to take part in the 2015 CHL/NHL Top Prospects Game. In the NHL Central Scouting Bureau's final list of players for the draft, Sprong was listed as the 20th best North American skater. He was ultimately selected in the second round, 46th overall, by the Pittsburgh Penguins.

After his stint with the Penguins in 2015, Sprong rejoined the Islanders for the remainder of the 2015–16 season. He played 33 games for the Islanders and recorded 46 points. The team made the playoffs, where Sprong scored a further 15 points before the team was eliminated in the second round. An injury sustained during practice with the Penguins during the 2016 Stanley Cup playoffs kept Sprong out until January, 2017 when he rejoined Charlottetown. He only played 31 games that season, but finished with 59 points, the highest points-per-game average in the entire league. He finished his career with the Islanders with the third goals and second most points in team history, and during the playoffs he tied the record for most career goals and broke the records for most assists and points. Sprong led the Islanders in scoring with 20 points in 12 games as the team lost in the third round of the playoffs, ending his junior career. Following that he was recalled again by the Penguins to train with them during their time in the NHL playoffs.

Professional
Sprong signed a three-year entry-level contract with the Penguins on August 28, 2015. After impressing Penguins' management at training camp, Sprong made the Penguins opening roster for the 2015–16 season. In doing so, Sprong became the first player taken in the second round or later to make the opening night roster immediately after being drafted since Brandon Saad in 2011. His first game was on October 8 against the Dallas Stars. Sprong recorded his first goal on October 15, his fourth game, against Ottawa Senators goaltender Craig Anderson. Sprong played 18 games for the Penguins, scoring two goals, before the team decided to send him back to Charlottetown for the remainder of the season. When Sprong's QMJHL season ended he was reassigned to the Penguins minor league affiliate, the Wilkes-Barre/Scranton Penguins of the American Hockey League for their playoff run. He appeared in 10 games and recorded 7 points before the team was eliminated in the third round; Sprong was subsequently recalled to Pittsburgh to serve as a reserve player for their final playoff games. During a practice in the playoffs, Sprong injured his shoulder; the subsequent surgery and healing meant he would be unable to play again for roughly 7–8 months.

On December 3, 2018, the Penguins traded Sprong to the Anaheim Ducks in exchange for Marcus Pettersson. Remaining with the Ducks through the 2018–19 season, Sprong notched new career highs in posting 14 goals and 19 points in 47 games.

After a sub-par training camp with the Ducks, Sprong was placed on waivers prior to the 2019–20 season and upon going unclaimed was reassigned to the San Diego Gulls. With the direction to play a more complete two-way game, Sprong responded with scoring 11 goals and 27 points through 39 games. Sprong was recalled by the Ducks; however, he was unable to replicate his previous offensive performance with the Ducks, contributing with 2 points through 8 games before returning to the Gulls.

Sprong was traded to the Washington Capitals on February 24, 2020, in exchange for Christian Djoos. He was assigned to the Capitals' affiliate, the Hershey Bears. He signed a two-year, $1.45 million contract extension on September 18, 2020. He was traded to the Seattle Kraken, along with two draft picks, on March 21, 2022, for Marcus Johansson.

At the conclusion of his contract with the Kraken, Sprong as a free agent went un-signed over the summer. Approaching the  season, he re-joined the Kraken in signing a professional tryout contract to attend training camp. He was later signed during the pre-season to a one-year, two-way contract with the Kraken on October 3, 2022.

Personal life
Sprong was born in Amsterdam, Netherlands. His father, Hannie, was a professional hockey player in the Netherlands during the early 1990s and later managed a team there. At the age of seven Sprong moved from the Netherlands to Canada with his family in order to help develop his hockey career. The family settled in Île Bizard, Quebec, a community near Montreal. Sprong remains a Dutch citizen, but has applied for Canadian citizenship; as of 2016, he had still not received it. As a result, Sprong has not participated in any international tournaments, as he has declined to play for the Dutch national team, preferring to remain eligible for the Canadian national team.

Sprong is the third NHL player born in the Netherlands; the first two, Ed Kea and Ed Beers, were also raised in Canada.

Career statistics

Awards and honours

References

External links

 

1997 births
Anaheim Ducks players
Charlottetown Islanders players
Dutch emigrants to Canada
Dutch ice hockey right wingers
Hershey Bears players
Living people
Pittsburgh Penguins draft picks
Pittsburgh Penguins players
San Diego Gulls (AHL) players
Seattle Kraken players
Sportspeople from Amsterdam
Washington Capitals players
Wilkes-Barre/Scranton Penguins players